The Sun Military Awards (televised as A Night of Heroes: The Sun Military Awards since 2009) is an annual awards ceremony which honours members of the British armed forces and civilians involved with the forces. The awards are organised and sponsored by The Sun newspaper. The award trophies are designed and hand-made by British Silversmith and porcelain designer Kerry O'Connor.

During the televised ceremony, awards known as "Millies" are given out. The awards and their recipients are chosen by a select panel of ten judges, made up of national figures and military chiefs. Nominees of all but one of the categories are selected by the general public, with the remaining category winner chosen by the judges.

The first ceremony aired on Sky1 and was hosted by Tess Daly, but from 2009 until 2014, the awards were televised on ITV and are presented by Phillip Schofield and Amanda Holden. It currently airs on Forces TV.

Ceremonies

2008
The 2008 award ceremony was presented by Tess Daly, taking place on 16 December at Hampton Court Palace and was aired on Sky1 before Christmas that year.

2009

The 2009 award ceremony took place on 15 December 2009, and was broadcast on ITV on 21 December at 9pm. Phillip Schofield and Amanda Holden were the presenters for the first time.

The judges included John Terry, Jeremy Clarkson, Kelly Holmes, Ross Kemp and four ex-Service chiefs.

2010

The 2010 award ceremony was televised on ITV, on 20 December 2010. The ceremony was presented by Amanda Holden and Phillip Schofield.

2011

The 2011 award ceremony took place at the Imperial War Museum on 19 December 2011 and was televised on ITV, on 21 December 2011, at 8.30pm. It was hosted by Amanda Holden and Phillip Schofield.

The winners were:

2012

The 2012 award ceremony was again held at the Imperial War Museum on 6 December 2012 and was televised on ITV, on 15 December 2012 at 9pm and were hosted by Amanda Holden and Phillip Schofield.

2013

The 2013 award ceremony took place at the National Maritime Museum on 11 December and was televised on ITV on 16 December from 9pm. The ceremony was once again hosted by Amanda Holden and Phillip Schofield.

2014

The 2014 award ceremony took place at the National Maritime Museum on in December and was televised on ITV on 18 December from 8.30pm. The ceremony was hosted by Amanda Holden and Phillip Schofield. 

Four specially created awards marked the end of combat operations in Afghanistan, with the recipients chosen from previous winners of awards.

2015
The 2015 awards took place at Guildhall, London and were presented by Tom Bradby.

2016
The 2016 awards were presented by Lorraine Kelly on 14 December. They were televised on Forces TV.

2017
The 2017 awards were presented by Lorraine Kelly for the second time. The event took place on 13 December and were televised on Forces TV.

2018
The 2018 awards were presented by Lorraine Kelly for the third time. The event took place on 13 December and were televised on Forces TV.

2019
The 2019 awards were presented by Lorraine Kelly for the fourth time. The event was televised on Forces TV.

References 

British awards
Military of the United Kingdom
ITV (TV network) original programming
Sky UK original programming
2008 in British television
2009 in British television
2010 in British television
2011 in British television
2012 in British television
2013 in British television
2008 establishments in the United Kingdom
Award ceremonies in the United Kingdom
Awards established in 2008
The Sun (United Kingdom)
Charles III
Awards by newspapers